is a Japanese footballer currently playing as a forward for Cerezo Osaka U-23.

Career statistics

Club
.

Notes

References

External links

2003 births
Living people
Japanese footballers
Association football forwards
J3 League players
Cerezo Osaka players
Cerezo Osaka U-23 players